Gilvydas Biruta (born 10 October 1991) is a professional Lithuanian basketball player for CEP Lorient of the Nationale Masculine 1. He plays at the power forward position.

Professional career
After graduating University of Rhode Island, Biruta was a part of Denver Nuggets during the 2015 NBA Summer League.

On 5 August 2015, Biruta signed with Neptūnas Klaipėda.

On 24 February 2016, Biruta signed with Lavrio of the Greek Basket League. In five games Biruta averaged 3.4 points and 2.2 rebounds. On August 30, 2016, he signed with Aries Trikala. In March 2017, he moved to Assigeco Piacenza of the Serie A2.

On 4 July 2017, Biruta signed with JL Bourg-en-Bresse of the Pro A.

Biruta played one game for Cherkaski Mavpy but left the team in January 2019 with an injury. On 5 January 2020, Biruta joined Lietkabelis Panevėžys. He averaged 4.3 points and 1.6 rebounds per game. On 18 September 2020, Biruta signed with Heroes Den Bosch of the Dutch Basketball League. He was released on 20 October after the DBL had been suspended due to a national spike in coronavirus infections.

National team career
Biruta led the Lithuanian U-16 National Team to the bronze medals in the 2007 FIBA Europe Under-16 Championship by averaging 14.6 points, 8.0 rebounds, 1.8 steals and 1.3 blocks. He also been a part of Lithuanian U-18 team twice. First time he won silver medal with the Donatas Motiejūnas' led U-18 National Team. During his second appearance, Lithuanians finished fourth. Though, the successful youth national team years ended painfully when the U-20 team he represented suffered an fiasco, finishing only 14th in the 2011 FIBA Europe Under-20 Championship.

References

External links
Rhode Island Rams bio 

1991 births
Living people
Aries Trikala B.C. players
BC Prienai players
Dutch Basketball League players
Heroes Den Bosch players
Lavrio B.C. players
Lithuanian men's basketball players
Lithuanian expatriate basketball people in the United States
Power forwards (basketball)
Rhode Island Rams men's basketball players
Rutgers Scarlet Knights men's basketball players
Sportspeople from Jonava
St. Benedict's Preparatory School alumni